Second Edition may refer to:

 Second Edition (quartet)
 Second Edition, an alternative title for the 1979 album Metal Box by Public Image Ltd.

See also